Les Sept Paroles de Notre Seigneur Jésus-Christ sur la Croix (The seven words of our Lord Jesus Christ on the cross) is an 1855 oratorio by Charles Gounod.

Recordings
Les Sept Paroles de Notre Seigneur Jésus-Christ sur la Croix, Ensemble Vocal de Lausanne, Michel Corboz, Mirare - with Les Sept Paroles du Christ sur la Croix by Franck

References

Oratorios by Charles Gounod
1855 compositions
Oratorios based on the Bible